Gornja Ploča is a village in the Lika-Senj County, Croatia. The settlement is administered as a part of Lovinac municipality.

Location

Gornja Ploča is placed between Gospić and Gračac. It is located 27 kilometers from Gospić, 8 kilometres from Lovinac, and 3.6 kilometers from the Zagreb-Split highway. Gornja Ploča is located on state road D522, that connects the highway with Udbina and Plitvice.

Population/Demographics

According to national census of 2001, population of the settlement is 22.

References

Sources
 Gornja Ploča 

Populated places in Lika-Senj County
Serb communities in Croatia